The FDR Suite (often abbreviated fdrsuite) is a set of rooms at Adams House, Harvard College that were occupied by the 32nd president of the United States, Franklin Delano Roosevelt, from 1900-1904.

Background

In January 1900, 18-year-old Roosevelt and his Groton friend Lathrop Brown engaged rooms in Westmorly Court, (now B-Entry of Adams House). Built in 1898 and designed by the noted architects Warren and Wetmore (who also were responsible for Grand Central Station in New York) Westmorly was the newest and most luxurious building on what was called Harvard's Gold Coast, an area of luxury apartments for wealthy University students. The rooms were meticulously decorated in high Edwardian style by FDR's mother Sara Delano Roosevelt and FDR himself, and were used by FDR during his entire four years at Harvard.

After FDR left Harvard, the rooms were occupied by a succession of students until 1961. In June 1961, during Eleanor Roosevelt's visit to the College, the former first lady dedicated a plaque commemorating FDR's time there, and the rooms were converted into a study, officially named "The FDR Suite". After a brief return to student housing in the early 2000s, the rooms were finally set aside in perpetuity with the intention of creating Harvard's first memorial to Franklin Delano Roosevelt.

The Restoration

Begun in 2008, the restoration of Roosevelt's room consumed 6 years of research and $300,000, and was largely completed in 2014. The effort was led by the Franklin Delano Roosevelt Foundation Inc (formerly: the FDR Suite Foundation, an independent 501(c)3 US public charity led a group of interested individuals and Harvard alumni who privately raised the capital required to complete the project. The Suite is fully furnished with examples of period furniture, and contains almost 2000 period objects, much of it rare Harvard ephemera re-assembled in Cambridge from private collections worldwide. The restoration is intended not only to shed new light on the early years of one of the most influential American presidents of the 20th century, but to form one of the most illustrative collections of student life in the Gilded Age life anywhere in the world. The Suite is not open to the general public, but is routinely opened for Harvard students, alumni and affiliates, and maintains an active web presence. The Suite also functions as the physical and spiritual home of the Foundation, which maintains an active presence at the College, sponsoring scholarships under its FDR Global Citizenship Program, and also hosting the programs of the new Franklin Delano Roosevelt Center for Global Engagement, an innovation diplomacy think-tank. The Foundation has also published an illustrated history of Roosevelt, FDR: A Life in Pictures, which features pictures of the Suite.

See also
 FDR Presidential Library and Museum http://www.fdrlibrary.marist.edu/ 
 Adams House

Primary sources

Roosevelt, Franklin D.; Roosevelt, Elliot, ed. FDR: His Personal Letters (4 vol., 1947); volume one covers Roosevelt's years at Groton and Harvard; pg 371 gives a physical description of the Suite, and includes Roosevelt's own drawing of the floor plan; subsequent letters describe the rooms' decor and furnishing.

Architectural references

 Bainbridge Bunting, Margaret Henderson Floyd, Harvard: An Architectural History, Harvard University Press, 1985.
 Shand-Tucci, Douglass, Harvard University: An Architectural Tour, Princeton Architectural Press, 2001

Biographies of FDR with details of the FDR Suite

Freidel, Frank. Franklin D. Roosevelt: A Rendezvous with Destiny (1990), One-volume scholarly biography; covers entire life
Freidel, Frank. Franklin D. Roosevelt (4 vol 1952–73), the most detailed scholarly biography; ends in 1934.
Smith, Jean Edward FDR 2007 
Ward, Geoffrey C. Before The Trumpet: Young Franklin Roosevelt, 1882–1905 details of FDR's Harvard Years
Weishan, Michael  FDR: A Life in Pictures

External links
 The Franklin Delano Roosevelt Foundation site
 Adams House official site

Harvard University
Warren and Wetmore buildings